Kenyasus was an extinct genus of even-toed ungulates that existed in Africa during the Miocene.

References

Prehistoric Suidae
Fossil taxa described in 1986
Miocene even-toed ungulates
Miocene mammals of Africa
Prehistoric even-toed ungulate genera